Ooyala is a 1998 Telugu-language drama film written, directed, and composed by S. V. Krishna Reddy. It stars Srikanth, Ramya Krishna, Nassar and Suhasini. The film is produced by Sivalenka Krishna Prasad on Sridevi Movies banner. It is the remake of the Malayalam movie, Irattakuttikalude Achan (1997).

This film is about a couple sacrificing one of their twins to another childless couple. The film was a box office failure.

Cast
 Srikanth as Raja
 Ramya Krishna as Swapna
 Nassar
 Suhasini 
 S. P. Balasubrahmanyam
 Brahmanandam
 Mallikarjuna Rao
 Sudhakar
 AVS
 Rajitha

Music 
The music was composed by S. V. Krishna Reddy.

Reception 
Griddhaluru Gopala Rao of Zamin Ryot reviewed the film positively praising the story, screenplay and the comedy. He noted, "The director has made the film in a healthy manner without any vulgarity. It can be watched by everyone". A critic from Andhra Today wrote that "Directed by S. V. Krishna Reddy, it comes as a big let down to the audience who set high hopes on his movies".

References

External links
 
 Ooyala film on Youtube

1998 films
Indian romantic drama films
Films directed by S. V. Krishna Reddy
Films scored by S. V. Krishna Reddy
1990s Telugu-language films